Agnese Nano (born 5 November 1965 in Rome) is an Italian film, television and theater actress. Her first appearance was in 1987 but she became famous after her role as the young "Elena Mendola" in Cinema Paradiso by  Giuseppe Tornatore, in 1988. Nano felt that playing Elena "was a deeply nurturing experience, crucial for the development of her future career."

Filmography
1988: It's Happening Tomorrow, Daniele Luchetti
1988: Cinema Paradiso, Giuseppe Tornatore
1990: Faccione, Christian De Sica
1990: Adelaide, Lucio Gaudino
1991: Steps On The Moon, Claudio Antonino
1991: Baroque, Claudio Sestrieri
1992: The Abdomen Of Maria, Memé Perlini
1992: The Long Silence, Margarethe von Trotta
1992: L'edera, Edera
1993: Tired Men, Lucio Gaudino
1994: The Summer Of Bobby Charlton, Massimo Guglielmi
2001: Murderers in the festive days, Damiano Damiani
2002: Do Like Us, Francesco Apolloni
2003: Until I Make You Suffering, Francesco Colizzi
2004: Luna And The Others, Elisabetta Villaggio
2006: My Best Enemy, Gigliola

References

External links

  Agnese Nano in "Cinema Paradiso" at Youtube

1965 births
Living people
20th-century Italian actresses
21st-century Italian actresses
Italian film actresses
Italian stage actresses
Italian television actresses
Actresses from Rome